Abraham "Bo" Weinberg (January 7, 1900 – September 9, 1935) was a Jewish New York City mobster who became a hitman and chief lieutenant for the Prohibition-era gang boss Dutch Schultz. As Schultz expanded his bootlegging operations into Manhattan during Prohibition, he recruited Abe Weinberg and his brother George into his gang. Abe Weinberg would become one of Schultz's top gunmen during the Manhattan Bootleg Wars and was a suspect in the later high-profile gangland slayings of Jack "Legs" Diamond, Vincent "Mad Dog" Coll, and mob boss Salvatore Maranzano.

Background
In 1933, Schultz was indicted for tax evasion. Rather than face the charges, Schultz went into hiding and Weinberg assumed control of his criminal operations. When Schultz returned from hiding and won acquittal on the charges against him, he became suspicious of Weinberg, as it was rumored that Weinberg had been secretly negotiating with mob boss Lucky Luciano and Murder, Inc. boss Louis Buchalter to retain control of the Schultz organization.

On April 23, 1935, Bo Weinberg married Anna May Turner. According to the 1930 U.S. Census and the 1925 New York Census she was born in either 1915 or 1916, not in 1912 as stated in the marriage record.

Disappearance
On September 9, 1935, Bo Weinberg left a Midtown Manhattan nightclub and was never seen again. Conflicting reports emerged about the manner of his death. Gangland lore held that Schultz had personally executed him with a .45 automatic in a Midtown hotel room, while Schultz' lawyer Dixie Davis reported witnessing Schultz' bodyguard Lulu Rosenkrantz shoot Weinberg in the back of a car after a night of drinking; Davis later maintained that the shooting could have been accidental. Schultz himself informed Weinberg's brother George that "We hadda put a kimono on Bo," Schultz' code phrase to indicate that Weinberg's corpse had been encased in cement and dropped into the East River.

See also
List of people who disappeared

In popular culture
Bo Weinberg would be portrayed in the following films:
Billy Bathgate, 1991, based on the 1989 historical fiction novel of the same name by E. L. Doctorow; portrayed by Bruce Willis, in which Weinberg is depicted as having his feet encased in cement before being dropped alive into the East River. 
Gangster Wars, 1981, by Dana Goldstone
Hit the Dutchman, 1991, by Matt Servitto
Hoodlum, 1997, by Joe Guzaldo

References

Further reading
Lacey, Robert. Little Man: Meyer Lansky and the Gangster Life. London: Century, 1991.

External links
Birth record Birth record on FamilySearch.org

1900 births
1930s missing person cases
1935 deaths
20th-century American Jews
Missing gangsters
Missing person cases in New York City
Murdered Jewish American gangsters
People murdered in New York City
Male murder victims
Prohibition-era gangsters
Russian Jews